Damon of Thessalonica was a Macedonian statesman known from an inscription (143 BC) in Olympia, Elis, honouring Quintus Caecilius Metellus Macedonicus.

See also
Fourth Macedonian War
History of Thessaloniki#Roman_era
Macedonia (Roman province)

Notes

Ancient Macedonians
Roman-era Thessalonians
2nd-century BC Macedonians
Roman Olympia